Snappin' Necks is the debut studio album by the American rap metal band Stuck Mojo, released in the summer of 1995. The album was preceded by three separate demos, one of which landed the band a recording contract with Century Media Records in 1994, which led to this album. A video for "Not Promised Tomorrow" was also produced by Drew Stone of Stone Films.

Track listing
 "Not Promised Tomorrow" 3:14
 "Snappin' Necks" 3:34
 "F.O.D." 3:49
 "The Beginning of the End" 3:28
 "Cake" 3:44
 "2 Minutes of Death" 1:37
 "Who's the Devil" 5:11
 "Change My Ways" 3:28
 "Monkey Behind the Wheel" 5:53
 "Uncle Sam Sham" 3:54
 "Propaganda" 3:59

References

1995 debut albums
Stuck Mojo albums
Century Media Records albums